was an amateur tennis player from Japan who competed in the 1920s and 1930s, including the 1924 Summer Olympics.

Harada was also ranked World No. 10 by Myers and the U.S. No. 3 in 1925. He was ranked World No. 7 in 1926 by A. Wallis Myers of The Daily Telegraph.

In 1923 he won the All-Japan Championships singles title. Harada moved to the United States to continue his studies at the Harvard University. In 1926 he won the Jamaican International Championships. In 1929 he won the All-Japan Championships singles and doubles.

He was coached by Harry Cowles.

Personal life
Takeichi Harada was married and his first child was born in 1929. He was the head manager of a mall in Tokyo. In 1925 he was awarded the AAF World Trophy by the Amateur Athletic Foundation for his merits in tennis.

References

External links
 
 
 
 

1899 births
1978 deaths
Olympic tennis players of Japan
Tennis players at the 1924 Summer Olympics
Japanese male tennis players
Sportspeople from Osaka
20th-century Japanese people